The Philippine Basketball Association Most Valuable Player (MVP) is an annual Philippine Basketball Association (PBA) award given since the start of the league in 1975 to the best performing player of the season. The award is decided using criteria introduced since the 2011–12 season, which include accumulated statistical points, votes from media, players and the league's Commissioner's Office. The current holder of the award is Scottie Thompson.

The season MVP is for the whole season, which has two to three conferences, including the regular season, the playoffs and the Finals, while there is a Best Player of the Conference award for each conference, and a Best Import award for conferences where imports are allowed to play.

Benjie Paras remains the only rookie to have ever won the award to date, which he did during the  season.

As with the other annual awards given by the league, the winner receives The Leo Trophy, which is named in honor of Leo Prieto, the first commissioner of the PBA who served from 1975 until his retirement in 1983.

Criteria

The criteria used since the 2022–23 PBA season are as follows:
45% average statistical points
30% press and media votes
25% players' votes

Statistical points (SP) are computed as follows:
1 SP for every point scored, rebound assist, steal and shot blocked.
10 bonus points for every game won where the player played up to the semifinals.
15 bonus points for every game won where the player played in the Finals
Deduction of 1 SP for every turnover, 5 SP for every technical or flagrant foul without ejection, and 15 SP for any technical or flagrant foul that results in an ejection.

In addition, a Filipino player can only be eligible for awards if he played in at least 70% of his team's games.

MVP voting begins at the start of the Finals series of the last conference. All statistical points gathered from all levels of competition (elimination/classification round and playoffs) are included.

Previous criteria
The winner was selected by the following format (before 2006):
30% cumulative statistical points (points, rebounds, assists, blocks, turnovers etc.)
30% press and media votes
30% players' votes
10% four-man committee (representatives from the PBA Photographer's Group, SCOOP, the TV coverer and the Philippine Sportswriters Association)

With controversies with the selections, a new format was created starting at the 2006–07 season:
30% average statistical points
30% press and media votes
25% players' votes
10% TV coverer
5% Commissioner's Office

The criteria used since from the 2011–12 PBA season until the 2021 PBA season are as follows:
40% average statistical points
30% press and media votes
25% players' votes
5% Commissioner's Office

Winners

Multiple time winners

References

1975 establishments in the Philippines
Awards established in 1975
Basketball most valuable player awards
Most Valuable Player